The Municipal Wards of Kohima are the nineteen wards comprising the capital city of Nagaland, Kohima.  The municipality covers an area of about 20 km² with a population of 115,609. Each ward has its own council government and handles many of the functions that are handled by city governments in other jurisdictions.

List of municipal wards

See also
 Administrative division
 Urban area

References

Kohima
Wards of Kohima